Lamar Manuel-Liolevave (born 1 December 1995) is a Fiji international rugby league footballer who plays as er or  for the Tweed Heads Seagulls in the Queensland Cup.

He previously played for the Wests Tigers in the NRL.

Background
Born in Auckland, New Zealand, Liolevave is of Māori, Samoan and Fijian descent and played his junior rugby league for the Marist Saints. He later moved to Queensland, Australia to attend Keebra Park State High School. In July 2013, he signed a contract with the West Tigers starting in 2014.

Playing career

Early career
In 2013, Liolevave played for the Australian Schoolboys.

In 2014 and 2015, Liolevave played for the Wests Tigers' NYC team. He was named the Tigers' NYC Coach's Player of the Year in 2014. On 18 October 2014, he played for the Junior Kiwis against the Junior Kangaroos, playing off the interchange bench in the Kiwis' 15-14 win. Soon after, he re-signed with the Tigers on a 2-year contract.

2015
Liolevave graduated to the Tigers' New South Wales Cup team in 2015. In Round 4, he made his NRL debut for the Tigers against the Canterbury-Bankstown Bulldogs.

On 2 May 2015, Liolevave again played for the Junior Kiwis against Junior Kangaroos.

2016
In April 2016, Liolevave joined the Canterbury-Bankstown Bulldogs effective immediately on a contract to the end of 2017.

2019
He made his international debut, coming off the bench, in the 18-44 win against Samoa on 2 Nov 2019.

References

External links
Wests Tigers profile
Fiji profile

1995 births
Living people
Fiji national rugby league team players
Junior Kiwis players
Marist Saints players
New Zealand Māori rugby league players
New Zealand sportspeople of Samoan descent
New Zealand rugby league players
People educated at Keebra Park State High School
Rugby league players from Auckland
Rugby league second-rows
Wests Tigers NSW Cup players
Wests Tigers players